was a junior college in Neyagawa Osaka Prefecture, Japan, and was part of the Osaka Electro-Communication University network.

The Junior College was founded in 1958. The predecessor of the school, Tōa Denki Tsushin kōgakkō, was founded in 1941. The course of this Junior College was Electronics（Daytime and Evening. The school was disestablished in 2008.

Education in Osaka
Educational institutions established in 1958
Japanese junior colleges
Private universities and colleges in Japan
Universities and colleges in Osaka Prefecture
1958 establishments in Japan